Coborn may refer to:

Charles Coborn (1852–1945), British music hall singer and comedian born in Stepney, east London
Coborn Road railway station, station built by the Great Eastern Railway on the main line out of London from Liverpool Street
Coopers' Company and Coborn School, 11-18 school in Upminster, in the London Borough of Havering
Prisca Coborn (1622–1701), wealthy widow (her husband was a brewer) who established Coopers' Company and Coborn School in Bow in 1701

See also
Coburn (disambiguation)
Osborn (disambiguation)